Connersville station is an Amtrak station in Connersville, Indiana, served by the Cardinal. The original station was built in 1914 by the Cincinnati, Hamilton & Dayton Railroad and is adjacent to the currently-used shelter station.

Amtrak train 51, the westbound Cardinal, is scheduled to depart Connersville at 3:05 a.m. on Monday, Thursday and Saturday with a service to Indianapolis, Crawfordsville, Lafayette, Rensselaer, Dyer and Chicago Union Station.

Amtrak train 50, the eastbound Cardinal, is scheduled to depart Connersville at 1:26 a.m. on Wednesday, Friday and Sunday with a service to Cincinnati, Maysville, South Portsmouth, Ashland, Huntington, Charleston, Montgomery, Thurmond, Prince, Hinton, Alderson, White Sulphur Springs, Clifton Forge, Staunton, Charlottesville, Culpeper, Manassas, Alexandria and Washington, DC, and continuing on to New York City.

References

External links

Connersville Amtrak Station (USA Rail Guide -- Train Web)

Amtrak stations in Indiana
Transportation buildings and structures in Fayette County, Indiana
Former Baltimore and Ohio Railroad stations
Railway stations in the United States opened in 1914